Apgujeong is a rapid transit station on Seoul Subway Line 3. It is located in Apgujeong-dong in the Gangnam-gu administrative district of Seoul.  It has a pair of underground side platforms. The station has connections to 15 buses through 6 exits. It services Sinsa-dong and Apgujeong-dong. The area is named after a pavilion frequented by Han Myung-hoi, whose pen-name was Apgujeong.

Station layout

Average daily ridership

References

Seoul Metropolitan Subway stations
Metro stations in Gangnam District
Railway stations in South Korea opened in 1985
Seoul Subway Line 3